Mattia Bottolo (3 January 2000) is an Italian volleyball player who won 2021 European Championship. He also was a member of Italy team to won the title of 2022 FIVB Volleyball Men's World Championship.

References

External links
 

2000 births
Living people
Italian men's volleyball players
People from Bassano del Grappa
Sportspeople from the Province of Vicenza